This is a list of women writers who were born in Indonesia or whose writings are closely associated with that country.

A
Asmirandah (born 1989), actress, short story writer
Sekar Ayu Asmara (active since 2001), songwriter, screenwriter, film director
Boni Avibus (born 2002), playwright, poet, actress
Djenar Maesa Ayu (born 1973), novelist, short story writer, screenwriter, filmmaker

B
Fira Basuki (born 1972), novelist

C
Linda Christanty (born 1970), short story writer, essayist, journalist
Leila Chudori (born 1962), short story writer, novelist, scriptwriter
Rain Chudori (born 1994), short story writer, actress

D
Herawati Diah (born 1917), journalist

E
Alberthiene Endah (active since 1993), biographer, novelist, journalist

F
Lily Yulianti Farid (born 1971), short story writer, journalist

H
Ratih Hardjono (born 1960), journalist, non-fiction writer
Toeti Heraty (1933–2021), poet, academic
Stefani Hid (born 1985), novelist, short story writer, columnist

K
Marianne Katoppo (1943–2007), novelist, theologian
Rohana Kudus (1884–1972), first female Indonesian journalist

L
Dewi Lestari (born 1976), novelist, singer, songwriter

M
Okky Madasari (born 1984), novelist

N
Clara Ng (born 1973), novelist, short story writer, children's writer

P
Laksmi Pamuntjak (born 1971), poet, novelist, essayist, food writer
Intan Paramaditha (born 1979), novelist, short story writer, academic

R
Hanna Rambe (born 1940), journalist, novelist, biographer
Helvy Tiana Rosa (born 1970), playwright, short story writer
Siti Rukiah (1927–1996), poet, novelist
Prima Rusdi (born 1967), screenwriter, short story writer
Oka Rusmini (born 1967), poet, novelist

S
Titie Said (1935–2011), novelist, journalist, editor
Ratna Sarumpaet (1949), dramatist
Sariamin Ismail (1909–1995), novelist and educator active under the penname Selasih
Myra Sidharta (born 1927), literary scholar, columnist, autobiographer
Julia Suryakusuma (born 1954), journalist, non-fiction writer
Astrid Susanto (born 1936), politician, non-fiction writer, educator
Madelon Szekely-Lulofs (1899–1958), novelist, journalist

T
Marga T (born 1943), romance writer, children's writer
Totilawati Tjitrawasita (1945–1982), journalist, short story writer
S. K. Trimurti (1912–2008), journalist, political activist

U
Ucu Agustin (born 1976), journalist, documentary filmmaker
Ayu Utami (born 1968), novelist, short story writer

W
Mira W. (born 1951), novelist, screenwriter

-
Indonesian women writers, List of
Writers
Women writers, List of Indonesian